The Itabira Natural Monument is a Natural monument in the state of Espírito Santo, Brazil.

Location

The Itabira Natural Monument is in the municipality of Cachoeiro de Itapemirim, Espírito Santo.
It includes the Pedra do Itabira, a striking vertical rock.
The site includes overhanging rocks, fragments of Atlantic Forest and endangered birds such as the dusky-legged guan (Penelope obscura), Neotropical bellbird (genus Procnias), red-browed amazon (Amazona rhodocorytha) and saffron toucanet (Pteroglossus bailloni).
It attracts tourists, mountain-bikers, hikers and mountaineers.

History 

The name "Itabira" is from the Tupi-Guarani language and means "steep rock".
The stone was first climbed in 1947.
It became part of the Central Atlantic Forest Ecological Corridor, created in 2002.
Municipal law 5774 of 3 October 2005 recategorized the reserve as the Itabira Natural Monument.
In November 2014 the monument was enrolled in the National Register of Conservation Units (CNUC).
This made it eligible to receive environmental compensation funds and assistance in management.

Notes

Sources

Natural monuments of Brazil
Protected areas of Espírito Santo
1988 establishments in Brazil